Gustav Klitgård Dahl (born 21 January 1996) is a Danish footballer, who plays as a midfielder for Silkeborg IF.

Club career

Silkeborg IF
Dahl comes from the football school of Silkeborg IF. He signed his first professional contract in the summer 2014.

His official debut was on 31 May 2015, when he replaced Adeola Runsewe in the 82nd minute, in a game against AaB, which Silkeborg lost 1–2.

Dahl was out for nearly 9 months starting from August 2017, after undergoing two hip surgeries. He went back in April 2018 but got injured again in the beginning of the 2018/19 season. In February 2019, Dahl went out to the media and said, that he wasn't sure if he could play football again due to the surgeries he had to undergo in both hips. He also told, that his career was on risc.

References

External links
 Gustav Dahl  on silkeborgif.dk
 

1996 births
Living people
Danish men's footballers
Danish Superliga players
Silkeborg IF players
People from Silkeborg
Association football midfielders
Sportspeople from the Central Denmark Region